Conrad Jaden Egan-Riley (born 2 January 2003) is an English professional footballer who plays as a defender for Hibernian, on loan from Burnley. Egan-Riley started his career with Manchester City, and has represented both England and the Republic of Ireland in youth internationals.

Club career

Manchester City
A Manchester local, Egan-Riley has been training with Manchester City for over a decade. On 21 September 2021, he made his professional debut when he was named in the starting line up for Manchester City's EFL Cup tie against Wycombe Wanderers. He made his UEFA Champions League debut on 9 March 2022 in a 0–0 home draw against Sporting CP in the Round of 16. On 8 May 2022, Egan-Riley made his Premier League debut as a second half-time substituted player in a 5–0 home win over Newcastle United.

Burnley
On 1 July 2022, Burnley announced they had signed Egan-Riley on a permanent transfer from Manchester City. He was loaned to Scottish club Hibernian until the end of the season on 30 January 2023.

International career
Egan-Riley has represented England at every level from under-15 to under-19. He is also eligible to play for the Republic of Ireland through ancestry and represented them in the 2018 Victory Shield.

Career statistics

References

External links
 

2003 births
Living people
English footballers
England youth international footballers
Manchester City F.C. players
Burnley F.C. players
Association football defenders
Republic of Ireland association footballers
Republic of Ireland youth international footballers
English people of Irish descent
Premier League players
English Football League players
Hibernian F.C. players
Scottish Professional Football League players